The Shaker Mountain Wild Forest, an Adirondack Park unit of the Forest Preserve, is located in the towns of Northampton, Mayfield, Bleecker, and Caroga in Fulton County and the Town of Benson in Hamilton County. The southern terminus of the Northville-Placid Trail (NPT) is located at the trailhead in Waterfront Park in the Village of Northville.

Recreation
There are miles of trails for hiking, biking, horseback riding, snowshoeing, cross-country skiing, and snowmobiling. There are also lakes and ponds that are open to fishing, ice fishing, and paddling. The Kane Mountain Fire Tower, located within the area, provides "spectacular views of the surrounding areas lands and waters".

See also

 List of Wilderness Areas in the Adirondack Park

References

Wilderness areas in Adirondack Park
Protected areas of Hamilton County, New York
Protected areas of Fulton County, New York